The Sign can refer to:
The Sign (Ace of Base album), an alternate name for the Ace of Base album Happy Nation
"The Sign" (song), a 1993 hit from this album
The Sign (Crystal Lake album)
"The Sign" (Agents of S.H.I.E.L.D.), an episode of Agents of S.H.I.E.L.D.